Lanhoso is a Portuguesa Freguesia in the Municipality of Póvoa de Lanhoso, it has an area of 6.47 km² and 742 inhabitants (2011).

Population

References 

Freguesias of Póvoa de Lanhoso